Hugo Rüdel (7 February 1868 – 27 November 1934) was a German Choir director and conductor.

Life 
Rüdel was born in Havelberg. His father Johann Friedrich August Rüdel (1816-1887) ran a brickworks and was the town conductor of Havelberg. Hugo was the youngest of five children; his mother was Pauline Amalia Albertine, née Knüppelholz (1831-1891). He was christened on 10 May 1868 in the Havelberg City Church of St. Laurentius. From 1875 he attended the town school.

After training as a horn player at the Universität der Künste Berlin with Fritz Lehmann, he first worked as a French horn player at the Krolloper. Besides, he was a pupil for piano with Karl Heinrich Barth. After a short period as solo horn player with the Gürzenich Orchestra Cologne in Cologne, he became an accessory and chamber music wind player with the Staatskapelle Berlin. From 1899 to 1910, he was a teacher (professor from 1908) for French horn at the Hochschule für Musik zu Berlin. Also in 1899, Rüdel became conductor of the Berlin Court Opera Chorus, later the State Opera Chorus, and in 1910 he was appointed its first choral conductor; he held this position until his retirement in 1933. From 1906 to 1934 he was the choir director of the Bayreuth Festival. Furthermore, in 1916 he became first choral master of the Berliner Lehrer-Gesangverein. In 1920 he was again appointed director of the opera choir school at the Musikhochschule. Finally still on 21 March 1933 he was involved with the Staats- und Domchor in the organization of the Day of Potsdam, where the newly elected Reich Chancellor Adolf Hitler placed himself with public appeal in a Prussian national-conservative tradition.

Rüdel was married to Luise Geissler (24 September 1871 - 6 June 1956). He died in Berlin at the age of 66.

In 1903 and 1913, together with Richard Strauss, he published Nachgelassene Werke für Horn von Franz Strauss.

Honours 
Even before his death in 1933, a bronze bust was made, which was originally placed in the Berlin Cathedral.

In Bayreuth, not far from the Festspielhaus, a street was named after Hugo Rüdel.

Quotes 
As director of the Royal Cathedral Choir, the aforementioned has worked tirelessly for years to raise the choir's achievements to an artistic level that has hardly been reached before. These achievements have received the warmest recognition far beyond the borders of Germany.

Rüdel was awarded the cross  on 22 March 1918.

Sound and picture documents 
Rüdel recorded numerous records with all major labels in the twenties with the Staats- und Domchor and the Berliner Lehrer-Gesangverein; recordings were made in Bayreuth in 1927. In a film made at the Bayreuth Festival in 1934 he can be seen at a choir rehearsal.

Further reading 
 Deutsche Biographische Enzyklopädie, 2nd edition, vol. 8, Munich 2007, p. 604.
 Peter Hahn: Staats- und Domchor Berlin: ein Lese- und Bilderbuch. Badenweiler: Oase-Verlag 2004. 
 Dietmar Schenk: Die Hochschule für Musik zu Berlin. Wiesbaden, Steiner 2004, p. 141/42. .

References

External links 

 
 
 Fotos und Tondokumente in der Deutsche Biographische Enzyklopädie
 Tondokumente im Archiv der Stimmen der SLUB Dresden

1868 births
1934 deaths
People from Havelberg
German choral conductors
German conductors (music)
Academic staff of the Berlin University of the Arts